Didone abbandonata is an 1823 opera in two acts by Saverio Mercadante to a libretto by Andrea Leone Tottola after Metastasio's Didone abbandonata. It was first performed on 18 January 1823 at the Teatro Regio in Turin.

Recording
Didone abbandonata – Viktorija Miskunaite, Katrin Wundsam, Carlo Allemano, Emilie Renard, Diego Godoy, Pietro di Bianco, Coro Maghini, Academia Montis Regalis, Alessandro De Marchi DVD, Naxos, 2018

References

External links

Work details, Corago, University of Bologna (in Italian)
Libretto, 1823

Operas by Saverio Mercadante
Italian-language operas
1823 operas
Operas
Operas based on the Aeneid
Cultural depictions of Dido
Libretti by Andrea Leone Tottola